Sundre is a town in Alberta, Canada.

Sundre may also refer to:

Sundre, Gotland, a settlement in Sweden
Orlo Sundre (born 1932), a former American football coach
9374 Sundre, an asteroid discovered in 1993
 Sundre Township, Ward County, North Dakota, a township in Ward County, North Dakota, United States
Ål i Hallingdal, a settlement in Buskerud, Norway, also known as Sundre

See also
 
 Sunder (disambiguation)
 Sundar (disambiguation)